J. Grant Brittain (born 1955) is a photographer internationally recognized for his work documenting skateboarding. Brittain has been shooting skateboarding for over 30 years.

Skateboarding 

In his early 20s, Brittain got a job at the Del Mar Skate Ranch, starting work on the second day the skatepark was open.

Photography career 
Brittain began photographing skateboarding in 1979 at Del Mar. Brittain photographed many professional skateboarders skating at Del Mar including Tony Hawk, Steve Caballero, Mike McGill, and many others. Brittain became one of the first professional skate photographers to make a living photographing skateboarding.

In 1983, Brittain helped found Transworld Skateboarding working as an Editor and Senior Photographer.

References

External links 
 
 J. Grant Brittain 20/20 - Video Interview
 Featured Photographer: J. Grant Brittain - A Legacy of Influence - Analog Forever

Skate photographers
Living people
1955 births